Major histocompatibility complex, class II, DQ alpha 1, also known as HLA-DQA1, is a human gene present on short arm of chromosome 6 (6p21.3) and also denotes the genetic locus which contains this gene. The protein encoded by this gene is one of two proteins that are required to form the DQ heterodimer, a cell surface receptor essential to the function of the immune system.

Function 
HLA-DQA1 belongs to the HLA class II alpha chain paralogues. This class II molecule is a heterodimer consisting of an alpha (DQA) and a beta chain (DQB), both anchored in the membrane. It plays a central role in the immune system by presenting peptides derived from extracellular proteins. Class II molecules are expressed in antigen-presenting cells (APC: B lymphocytes, dendritic cells, macrophages).

Gene structure and polymorphisms 
The alpha chain contains 5 exons. Exon one encodes the leader peptide, exons 2 and 3 encode the two extracellular protein domains, exon 4 encodes the transmembrane domain and the cytoplasmic tail. Within the DQ molecule both the alpha chain and the beta chain contain the polymorphisms specifying the peptide binding specificities, resulting in up to 4 different molecules. Typing for these polymorphisms is routinely done for bone marrow transplantation.

Alleles

DQ1
There are four commonly encountered DQA1 alleles: DQA1*0101, *0102, *0103, *0104. These alleles are always found in haplotypes with HLA-DQB1*05 (DQ5) and HLA-DQB1*06 (DQ6).  DQ1 is a serotype, rare among serotypes for human class II antigens, in that the antibodies to DQ1 react to the alpha chain of HLA DQ, these DQA1 allele gene products.

Other
The other DQA1 alleles have no defined serotype. There are 5 groups, DQA1*02, *03, *04, *05, *06. DQA1 within these groups are either invariant or produce the same α-chain subunit. DQA1*02 and DQA1*06 contain only one allele. DQA1*03 has three alleles which each produce nearly identical α3. For DQA1*05, the DQA1*0501 and DQA1*0505 produce identical α5.  Other DQA1*05 exist that produce variant  α5var, but these are rare.

See also
 Major histocompatibility complex
 Human leukocyte antigen
 HLA-DQ

References

Further reading

Human proteins